Agra acuspina is a species of beetle in the family Carabidae. It is found in Peru.

References 

Insects described in 1979
Insects of South America
Lebiinae